The .44-40 Winchester, also known as .44 Winchester, .44 WCF (Winchester Center Fire), and .44 Largo (in Spanish-speaking countries) was introduced in 1873 by the Winchester Repeating Arms Company. It was the first metallic centerfire cartridge manufactured by Winchester, and was promoted as the standard chambering for the new Winchester Model 1873 rifle. As both a rifle and a handgun caliber, the cartridge soon became widely popular, so much so that the Winchester Model 1873 rifle became known as "The gun that won the West."

History 
When Winchester released the new cartridge, many other firearm companies chambered their guns in the new round. Remington and Marlin released their own rifles and pistols which chambered the round, Colt offered an alternative chambering in its popular Single Action Army revolver in a model known as the Colt Frontier Six-Shooter, and Smith & Wesson began releasing their Smith & Wesson New Model 3 chambered in .44-40. Settlers, lawmen, and cowboys appreciated the convenience of being able to carry a single caliber of ammunition which they could fire in both pistol and rifle. In both law enforcement and hunting usage, the .44-40 became the most popular cartridge in the United States, and to this day has the reputation of killing more deer than any other save the .30-30 Winchester.

The cartridge was originally sold as .44 Winchester. Over time, the name stuck, and eventually Winchester adopted the .44-40 designation for the round after World War II. Winchester uses the designation "44-40 Winchester" on packaging.

Technical background 
Winchester soon began to carry the 217-gr loading, as well, but in 1905, UMC discontinued the heavier load.
Soon, both companies were offering the cartridge with lead "metal patched" (i.e. copper-jacketed with lead points), and full metal jacket versions.
Taking advantage of the stronger-action designs of the Winchester model 1892 and the Marlin 1894 lever-action rifles, in 1903, Winchester began offering a higher-performance version of the loading called the Winchester High Velocity (WHV), with a velocity of  using a 200-gr copper-jacketed bullet from a  barrel length, UMC and Peters Cartridge Company soon introduced equivalents. Over the years, a number of different bullet weights and styles have been offered, including 122, 140, 160, 165, 166, 180, and 217 gr in lead, soft- and hollow-point, full metal case, blanks, and shot shells. The most common current loading is a 200-gr bullet at 1190 ft/s.

By 1942, more modern cartridges had all but eclipsed the .44-40, but it regained some popularity in the 1950s and 1960s when Colt began once again to manufacture the Single Action Army and Frontier. More recently, the .44-40 has had a resurgence due to the popularity of metallic silhouette and cowboy action shooting, which inspired the introduction of a low-velocity  gallery load, the heaviest factory bullet ever available for the cartridge.

See also
List of handgun cartridges
List of rifle cartridges
Table of handgun and rifle cartridges

References

Bibliography
 Julian S. Hatcher, Hatcher's Notebook, Harrisburg, Pa., Military Service Pub. Co., 1947 [Riling 2596] page 436 - 

Pistol and rifle cartridges
Weapons and ammunition introduced in 1873
Dual-purpose handgun/rifle cartridges
Rimmed cartridges
Winchester Repeating Arms Company cartridges